Judy Ponder 1980-present 
Bart Patton (born Phillip Bardwell; 11 July 1939 in Culver City, California), is an American actor, producer, and director.

Biography
Bart's first acting job was as Scampy the Clown in Super Circus where he was credited as "Bardy Patton". He continued making acting appearances in such television shows as 77 Sunset Strip while in high school. He replaced Burt Reynolds on Riverboat.

Patton attended UCLA, where he met his future wife, Mary Mitchel, and Francis Ford Coppola, with whom he made a student film. He dropped out after only one semester to make Gidget Goes Hawaiian, marrying Mitchel after completion of the film.

Patton stayed married to Mary Mitchel (1961-1980) (divorced) (2 children).

Coppola cast the couple in his Dementia 13 that introduced him to producer Roger Corman and Jack Hill, who reshot some of the film.  Patton moved behind the camera in Hill's Spider Baby as production manager and assistant director whilst Mary Mitchel co-starred. Corman used Patton to produce additional footage for some of his films for television release.<ref>Lisanti, Tom Hollywood Surf and Beach Movies: The First Wave, 1959-1969 2005 McFarland</ref>

Corman financed Patton's first film, Beach Ball, as a producer. Universal Pictures was impressed, with Universal and MCA signing a contract in 1965 for Patton and director Lennie Weinrib to make 14 rock and roll films in a two-year period. However, the only ones produced were a ski party type film,  Wild Wild Winter, and a spy spoof, Out of Sight. Patton also produced Coppola's The Rain People.

He made his directorial debut with Unshackled'' in 2000.

Filmography

References

External links
 

American film directors
American male actors
American film producers
1939 births
Living people
University of California, Los Angeles alumni